Alex Carter (born Alex Apostolopoulos; November 12, 1964) is a Canadian television and film actor.

Early life
Carter was born Alex Apostolopoulos in Toronto, Ontario, Canada. He attended Lawrence Park Collegiate Institute as well as Wexford Collegiate Institute and was quite involved with the Wexford C.I. football team.   He lived in the Wexford community of Toronto (Scarborough) and attended Wexford Public School. Alex finished high school   and, then left for Hollywood where he studied at the Beverly Hills Playhouse. He is divorced and the father of three children.

Career
Carter's television roles have included recurring roles on roles in Family Passions, Black Harbour, Traders, Made in Canada, Taking the Falls, The Pretender, These Arms of Mine, Flashpoint, Wildfire, Castle, Life, Without a Trace, Nip/Tuck, The Mermaid Chair, The Practice, Shark, Due South, CSI: NY, Leverage, JAG, Veritas: The Quest and Jericho, as well as recurring roles in CSI: Crime Scene Investigation as LVPD Homicide Detective Lou Vartann (32 episodes), Revenge as Michael Davis, Point Pleasant (9 episodes), and Burn Notice (6 episodes). He had a role in a few of the final scenes of the series finale of 24.

His film roles have included Out of Time and The Island. He also starred with Cary Elwes and Alex Rocco in the thriller film The Other.

Filmography

Film

Television

Notes

External links

1964 births
Living people
Canadian male film actors
Canadian people of Greek descent
Canadian male television actors
Male actors from Toronto